Casper Mountain,  an anticline, is located at the north end of the Laramie Mountains overlooking Casper, Wyoming along the North Platte River.

Recreation
Casper Mountain is largely privately owned, however there are several miles of trails for hiking, mountain biking, and horseback riding.

There are many recreation opportunities on the mountain. Hogadon Ski Area is one of very few ski areas with a parking/entry point located above the resort. Although small, the ski area provides a large source of winter entertainment on the mountain.  Other winter activities include cross country skiing, snowshoeing, fatbiking, and snowmobiling. A small part of the cross country ski trails are lit at night, providing night skiing.

The southern side of the mountain is bordered by Muddy Mountain, which itself has many recreation opportunities.

Summer activities on Casper Mountain include camping, hiking, mountain biking, horseback riding, and picnicking. The Braille Trail is a short scenic hike meant for those who are blind, but catering to everyone.  The trail celebrated its 35th anniversary in 2010, and was visited by about 2,000 people. The area around the trail has picnic sites, and is popular during the summer. The trail is accessible on a road near the base of Tower Hill. Along with the Braille Trail, Casper Mountain has many other hiking trails. At the base of the mountain's north side lies Garden Creek Falls. The Casper Rotary Club manages the trails around the area and, beginning in December 2010, started to renovate some of the trails in order to make them safer for hikers. The club plans to install low intensity lighting in the parking lot, powered by solar panels.

The mountain is also host to an annual summer-solstice gathering at Crimson Dawn. This event, based upon children's stories told by a local woman to her children in the 1930s and 1940s, has grown into a local tradition, with hundreds of families migrating up the mountain to see actors re-enact tales of witches and warlocks.

Casper Mountain is also home to Beartrap Meadow, a large open space at the base of the road leading to the far east side of the mountain. Large parties have and continue to be held in the meadow. Beartrap Meadow also houses several campsites. Since 1994 Beartrap Meadow has hosted the Beartrap Summer Festival in late July or early August. It features bluegrass music and has included bands such as Ricky Skaggs, Earl Scruggs and the Nitty Gritty Dirt Band.

Wildlife
Wildlife on the mountain includes wild grouse, mule deer and elk, among other species native to Wyoming. Mountain lions have also been spotted on the mountain. On the west flank of the mountain in Jackson canyon, one of the largest migratory populations of bald eagles in the world take shelter during certain times of year.

Geology

Climate

Broadcasting
All of Casper's high powered television stations originate from towers on the mountain, as do a vast majority of the area's FM radio signals. A cross country ski area cuts right through an area known as Tower Hill (see pictures), where many of the towers are located. 
Local, State and Federal agencies - BLM, Sheriff, Fire, EMS and Casper PD - operate sites on Casper mountain providing both analog and digital support for traditional radio systems as well as the WyoLink  statewide trunking system. There are other commercial sites on the mountain as well, providing such services as Wireless ISP and Cell phones.
Local amateur radio operators also take advantage of the mountain. One of the more heavily used amateur repeaters is operated by the Casper Amateur Radio Club - W7VNJ.

Fires
Although the mountain has seen its fair share of fires, in August 2006 a large wildfire known as the Jackson Canyon Fire burned 11,496 acres (40 km) on the western end of Casper Mountain,
In September 2012, the Sheep Herder Complex fire burned 15,887 acres, and consumed 37 residences and 23 outbuildings, according to InciWeb. The fire was 100 percent contained by September 16, 2012. The cause of the fire remains unknown.

References

External links
Casper Mountain Adventure Group
Hogadon Ski Area official website
Casper Mountain Radio Tower Information

Mountains of Wyoming
Mountains of Natrona County, Wyoming
Casper, Wyoming
Braille trail sites